Srđan Gašić (Serbian Cyrillic: Срђан Гашић; born 23 November 1975) is a retired Serbian football player.

Club career
At the beginning of his career, he played for the club FK Goč of Vrnjačka Banja. He moved to FK Sloga Kraljevo as a 19-year-old player. He later played with FK Jedinstvo Paraćin, OFK Beograd, FK Javor Ivanjica, FK Radnički Obrenovac, FC Vihren Sandanski, FK Metalac Gornji Milanovac. In 2006, he signed with Breiðablik UBK from Iceland where he played three seasons. He played 393 games, and scored 18 goals in his career. He usually played as central defender.

After retiring he became youth coach of FC Volley from Vrnjačka Banja.

References

1975 births
Living people
Footballers from Rijeka
Serbian footballers
Association football defenders
OFK Beograd players
FK Javor Ivanjica players
FK Radnički Obrenovac players
FK Sloga Kraljevo players
Srdan Gasic
Expatriate footballers in Iceland
Serbs of Croatia